The optical power budget in a fiber-optic communication link is the allocation of available optical power (launched into a given fiber by a given source) among various loss-producing mechanisms such as launch coupling loss, fiber attenuation, splice losses, and connector losses, in order to ensure that adequate signal strength (optical power) is available at the receiver. In  optical power budget attenuation is specified  in decibel (dB) and optical power in dBm.

The amount of optical power launched into a given fiber by a given transmitter depends on the nature of its active optical source (LED or laser diode) and the type of fiber, including such parameters as core diameter and numerical aperture. Manufacturers sometimes specify an optical power budget only for a fiber that is optimum for their equipment—or specify only that their equipment will operate over a given distance, without mentioning the fiber characteristics. The user must first ascertain, from the manufacturer or by testing, the transmission losses for the type of fiber to be used, and the required signal strength for a given level of performance.

In addition to transmission loss, including those of any splices and connectors, allowance should be made for at least several dB of optical power margin losses, to compensate for component aging and to allow for future splices in the event of a severed cable.

LT = αL + Lc + Ls

Definitions:
LT - Total loss
α - Fiber attenuation
L - Length of fiber
Lc - Connector loss
Ls - Splice loss

Passive optical networks use optical splitters to divide the downstream signal into up to 32 streams, most often a power of two. Each division in two halves the transmitted power and therefore causes a minimum attenuation of 3 dB ( ≈ 10−0.3).

References

External links
Fiberoptic power budget calculator

Fiber-optic communications